Rajabi Eslami (born 27 April 1937) is an Iranian weightlifter. He competed in the men's bantamweight event at the 1964 Summer Olympics.

References

External links
 

1937 births
Living people
Iranian male weightlifters
Olympic weightlifters of Iran
Weightlifters at the 1964 Summer Olympics
Place of birth missing (living people)
20th-century Iranian people